Karlo Mijić (1887–1964) was a Yugoslav painter noted for his paintings of the Bosnian landscape.

References

1887 births
1964 deaths
Yugoslav painters